The Baltic mixed forests is an ecoregion in Europe along the southwestern coasts of the Baltic Sea. The name was coined by the European Environment Agency and the same geographical area is designated as "Northern Europe: Germany, Denmark, Sweden, and Poland" ecoregion by the WWF.

Distribution
Despite the name, Baltic mixed forests are not found in any of the Baltic countries. These countries are instead dominated by the Sarmatic mixed forests ecoregion, with the exception of southern Lithuania, which is within the northern reaches of the Central European mixed forests. Rather, Baltic mixed forests are found along the western and southern shores of the Baltic Sea, comprising northwestern Poland, northeastern Germany, eastern Denmark and the very southernmost tip of Sweden. More specifically, they are common in lowland areas on the eastern side of the Danish peninsula and submontane areas north of the Elbe and Oder Rivers.

Flora
The ecoregion's natural habitat type is lowland to submontane beech and mixed beech forests. For the beech, European beech (Fagus sylvatica) is dominant. Other tree species that mix in, covers a broad array of mostly deciduous trees, but also conifer to a small extent. Oak, elm, ash, linden, maple, hazel, rowan and birch are common among the many deciduous trees mixed in with beech.

Fauna

Ecological challenges 
According to a 2015 study into the effect of climate change on the Baltic Sea Basin, the changes in temperature and precipitation patterns are likely to change the south-western Baltic forest's flora considerably, with a shift in the natural species composition towards more drought tolerant species, leading to a decrease in species diversity and a decrease in groundwater recharge. Similarly, the fauna of the region will also be adversely affected, due to the Baltic region's particularly sensitive nature to changes in salinity, which can have a cascading effect on food webs and interaction between aquatic and terrestrial ecosystems.

References

External links 

Ecoregions of Denmark
Ecoregions of Europe
Ecoregions of Germany
Ecoregions of Poland
Ecoregions of Sweden
.
.
.
.
Forests of Denmark
Forests of Sweden
Forests and woodlands of Germany
Forests of Poland
Palearctic ecoregions
Temperate broadleaf and mixed forests